Technoform is a German manufacturing company headquartered in Kassel, Germany, with operations worldwide. The company specializes in the extrusion of thermoplastic profiles and employs 1,500 people worldwide.

History 
Technoform was founded in 1969 by Karl-Hans Caprano and Erwin Brunnhofer in Kassel. The family-run enterprise first began to manufacture technical extrusions from thermoplastics under the German-language tagline "Präzision in Kunststoff" (English: Precision in plastic). The first patent application for the PPZ I process developed by Technoform was filed in 1975.

In its early years, the company manufactured special profiles made from polystyrene, surface profiles made from ABS for skis, and running surface profiles from polyethylene. Over time, the company successively expanded its product portfolio, and, since the 1990s, has continually enlarged its production and sales capacities across various divisions. The company is now in its second generation, managed by family members of the original founders. It has a presence in major markets with its own dedicated production facilities or regional sales offices on nearly every continent.

At the end of September 2016, two companies, the Kassel-based Extrusion Tooling GmbH (TET) and the Fuldabrück-based Technoform Bautec GmbH, announced their intention to merge. This would theoretically lead to an automatic breakup of TET's existing works council following the merger. This led to accusations from multiple parties that this was the real intention behind the merger.

Locations 
The company headquarters are in Kassel in the north of the state of Hesse in Germany. Technoform is one of the major companies in the region. The German production sites are located in Kassel and Lohfelden. Technoform also has manufacturing facilities in Italy, Spain, the United States, China, Hong Kong, and Singapore.

Products 
Technoform specializes in the extrusion of thermoplastic profiles. This specialization applies particularly to the manufacture and development of insulating profiles for aluminum windows, doors, and facades. Technoform is also one of the leading suppliers of plastic hybrid stainless steel spacers and other thermally optimized solutions for the edge seal of the insulating glass unit. Along with its range of standardized products, the company also offers tailor-made solutions and high-precision thermoplastics adapted to the individual needs of customers from numerous industries.

References 

Manufacturing companies of Germany
Companies based in Kassel
1969 establishments in Germany